Bluebell is a census-designated place in eastern Duchesne County, Utah, United States, on the Uintah and Ouray Indian Reservation. The population as of the 2010 census was 293. It lies along local roads east of State Route 87, northeast of the city of Duchesne, the county seat of Duchesne County. Although Bluebell is unincorporated, it has a post office, with the ZIP code of 84007.

Bluebell was first settled by Elmer Gates in 1907.

Bluebell's most notable old families include the Remingtons, the Winklers, the Monsens, and the Goodriches. Its most notable attractions include Bluebell Store, the Monsen Family Corn Maze, and Bluebell Cemetery.

Climate
According to the Köppen Climate Classification system, Bluebell has a semi-arid climate, abbreviated "BSk" on climate maps.

See also

 List of census-designated places in Utah

References

External links

Census-designated places in Duchesne County, Utah
Census-designated places in Utah
Populated places established in 1907